P-V curve may refer to:
 Pressure-volume curves in ecology
 Pressure–volume diagram in physics and physiology
 Power-voltage curve in electrical engineering